Life Enigma is an album by French jazz fusion artist Jean-Luc Ponty, released in 2001. It is his first on his own label, JLP and arrives seven years since his last solo studio release No Absolute Time (1993).

Critical reception

Todd Jenkins stated in his All About Jazz review: "...Ponty shows he’s up to the task of carrying the spirit of fusion into the new millennium instead of just mining the same old spent lodes. Though it was a while in coming, Life Enigma was worth every minute of the wait." Glenn Astarita states "...if you're expecting some of the innovative pyrotechnics and high-octane jazz-fusion witnessed on some of his previous sessions you might be disappointed." while Ken Dryden in AllMusic proclaimed that "This is easily one of Jean-Luc Ponty's most compelling releases."

Track listing 
All songs by Jean-Luc Ponty.
 "Two Thousand-One Years Ago" – 4:20
 "Signals from Planet Earth" – 6:03
 "The Infinite Human Caravan" – 6:37
 "Lonely Among All" – 4:25
 "Firmament" – 7:22
 "Pizzy Cat" – 3:16
 "Life Enigma" – 5:56
 "Even the Sun Will Die" – 5:37
 "Love at Last Sight" – 5:15
 "And Life Goes On" – 6:01

Personnel
 Jean-Luc Ponty – violin, keyboards, Synclavier, electronic percussion, electronic drums, effects
 William Lecomte – piano
 Guy N'Sangue – bass
 Thierry Arpino – drums, shaker
 Moustapha Cisse – percussion

Production notes
 Jean-Luc Ponty – producer, engineer
 Karim Sai – mixing, engineer
 Greg Calbi – mastering
 Alan Chappell – art direction, design
 Adam Rogers – photography
 Alvaro Yanez – cover photo

References

2001 albums
Jean-Luc Ponty albums